Pub rock may refer to:

Pub rock (Australia), a style of Australian rock and roll popular throughout the 1970s and 1980s
Pub rock (United Kingdom), a rock music genre that was developed in mid-1970s in the United Kingdom